Fraxinus ornus, the manna ash or South European flowering ash, is a species of Fraxinus native to southern Europe and southwestern Asia, from Spain and Italy north to Austria and the Czech Republic, and east through the Balkans, Turkey, and western Syria to Lebanon and Armenia.

Description
The bark is dark grey, remaining smooth even on old trees.

The buds are pale pinkish-brown to grey-brown, with a dense covering of short grey hairs.

Cultivation and uses
Fraxinus ornus is frequently grown as an ornamental tree in Europe north of its native range for its decorative flowers—the species is also sometimes called "flowering ash". Some cultivated specimens are grafted on rootstocks of Fraxinus excelsior, with an often very conspicuous change in the bark at the graft line to the fissured bark of the rootstock species.

A sugary extract from the sap may be obtained by making a cut in the bark; this was compared in late medieval times (attested by around 1400 AD) with the biblical manna, giving rise to the English name of the tree, and some of the vernacular names from its native area (fresno del maná in Spanish, frassino da manna in Italian). In fact, the sugar mannose and the sugar alcohol mannitol both derive their names from the extract.

References

External links

 Production of manna in Sicily
 Fraxinus ornus  - information, genetic conservation units and related resources. European Forest Genetic Resources Programme (EUFORGEN)

ornus
Flora of Southeastern Europe
Flora of Western Asia
Flora of Ukraine
Flora of Spain
Flora of Sardinia
Flora of Portugal
Flora of France
Flora of Corsica
Flora of Switzerland
Flora of the Czech Republic
Flora of Hungary
Flora of Armenia
Flora of Azerbaijan
Flora of Georgia (country)
Plants described in 1753
Taxa named by Carl Linnaeus
Garden plants of Asia
Garden plants of Europe
Ornamental trees
Trees of mild maritime climate
Trees of Mediterranean climate